Crellin is a surname of Manx origin. Notable people with the surname include:

Benjamin Crellin, New Zealand comedian, actor and writer
Bertie Crellin (1902–1993), Australian rules footballer
Billy Crellin (born 2000), British footballer
David Crellin (born 1961), British actor
Jeffrey Crellin, Australian oboist
John Crellin, Manx politician
Max Crellin (born 1933), Australian politician

Manx-language surnames